Eileen Grench (born 5 August 1986) is a Panamanian sabre fencer and a journalist. She competed in the 2016 Summer Olympics held in Rio de Janeiro.

A graduate of the Columbia University Graduate School of Journalism, her work as an investigative reporter covering global migration appeared in The Intercept, The Nation, and Documented. She covered juvenile justice in New York for the online news source The City. Since April, 2022, Grench has been a justice reporter at The Daily Beast.

References

1986 births
Living people
Panamanian female sabre fencers
Fencers at the 2016 Summer Olympics
Olympic fencers of Panama
Pan American Games medalists in fencing
Pan American Games bronze medalists for Panama
Fencers at the 2015 Pan American Games
Central American and Caribbean Games silver medalists for Panama
Competitors at the 2010 Central American and Caribbean Games
Competitors at the 2014 Central American and Caribbean Games
Competitors at the 2018 Central American and Caribbean Games
Central American and Caribbean Games medalists in fencing
21st-century Panamanian women